The statue of John the Baptist is an outdoor sculpture by Josef Max, installed on the north side of the Charles Bridge in Prague, Czech Republic.

External links

 

Christian sculptures
Sculptures depicting John the Baptist
Monuments and memorials in Prague
Sculptures of men in Prague
Statues on the Charles Bridge